The canton of Bressuire is an administrative division of the Deux-Sèvres department, western France. Its borders were modified in March 2015 when the French canton reorganisation came into effect. Its seat are in Bressuire.

It consists of the following communes:
Boismé
Bressuire
Chiché
Faye-l'Abbesse
Geay

References

Cantons of Deux-Sèvres